Stepnoy is a rural locality (a settlement) and the administrative center of Aksaraysky Selsoviet, Krasnoyarsky District, Astrakhan Oblast, Russia. The population was 62 as of 2010. There are 17 streets.

Geography 
It is located 61 km from Astrakhan, 28 km from Krasny Yar.

References 

Rural localities in Krasnoyarsky District, Astrakhan Oblast